Rasooli is a surname. Notable people with the surname include:

 Anisa Rasooli (born 1969), Afghan judge
 Darwish Rasooli (born 1999), Afghan cricketer

See also
 Nisbat-e-Rasooli

Surnames of Afghan origin